Ion Timofte (born 16 December 1967) is a Romanian retired footballer who played as an attacking midfielder.

He spent the vast majority of his career in Portugal, amassing Primeira Liga totals of 215 matches and 61 goals over nine seasons with Porto and Boavista and winning seven major titles both clubs combined.

Club career

Early years / Porto
Timofte was born in Anina, and started playing with local Minerul before signing with Liga II club CSM Reşiţa in early 1989. He made his debut in Liga I with FC Politehnica Timișoara after joining them in the summer, notably helping his team oust Atlético Madrid in the first round of the 1990–91 UEFA Cup by playing 175 minutes of a possible 180 in a 2–1 aggregate win.

In July 1991, Timofte moved to FC Porto. He made his Primeira Liga debut on 24 August, scoring the first goal in a 2–0 away triumph against G.D. Estoril Praia.

Timofte netted 11 times in 23 games in the 1992–93 season, as the Dragons renewed their domestic supremacy. During his three-year tenure, two of his goals helped defeat S.L. Benfica in O Clássico twice, on 22 March 1992 (3–2 away success) and 15 November of that year (1–0 home win, through a penalty kick).

Boavista
Timofte joined Boavista F.C. in the 1994 off-season. He hade his best year with the side in 1998–99 after the arrival of the new manager Jaime Pacheco, scoring 15 goals to help to the second position behind Porto.

The 1999–2000 campaign started with Timofte helping the northerners reach the group stage of the UEFA Champions League, starting in both legs of the tie against Brøndby IF and providing an assist in the 2–1 win in Denmark, in an eventual 6–3 aggregate score. He also begun dealing extensively with injuries, however, retiring in June 2000 at the age of 32.

After his retirement, Timofte opened a restaurant and a hotel in Timișoara, both called Boavista.

International career
Timofte earned ten caps for Romania. His debut came on 3 April 1991, coming on as an 85th-minute substitute for Florin Răducioiu in a 0–0 away draw against Switzerland for the UEFA Euro 1992 qualifiers; 14 days later, in a friendly in Spain, he scored his first and only goal, contributing to the 2–0 win in Cáceres.

International stats

International goals

Honours

Club
FC Porto
Primeira Divisão: 1991–92, 1992–93
Taça de Portugal: 1993–94
Supertaça Cândido de Oliveira: 1991, 1993

Boavista FC
Taça de Portugal: 1996–97
Supertaça Cândido de Oliveira: 1997

References

External links

1967 births
Living people
People from Caraș-Severin County
Romanian footballers
Association football midfielders
Liga I players
CSM Reșița players
FC Politehnica Timișoara players
Primeira Liga players
FC Porto players
Boavista F.C. players
Romania international footballers
Romanian expatriate footballers
Expatriate footballers in Portugal
Romanian expatriate sportspeople in Portugal